Cow lung is used in various cuisines and as a source for pulmonary surfactants. In Peru it is known as bofe. In Indonesia, Nasi kuning can be made with cow lung. Paru goreng is fried cow lung Padang food. It is a type of offal.

Animal derived surfactants include Beractants Alveofact extracted from cow lung lavage fluid and Survanta extracted from minced cow lung with additional DPPC, palmitic acid and tripalmitin.

Defibrotide is a deoxyribonucleic acid derivative (single-stranded) derived from cow lung.

References

Southeast Asian cuisine
Beef